Pelophila borealis is a species of ground beetle in Nebriinae subfamily which was described by Gustaf von Paykull in 1790. The species can be found in Belarus, Canada, Estonia, Finland, Latvia, Norway, Russia, and Sweden. It is black in colour and is shiny.

References

Beetles described in 1790
Beetles of Europe